There was room for 18 teams in the 1984 Tour de France; in early 1984, there were 17 candidate teams. Although the Tour organisation approached AVP-Viditel and Metauromobili, an 18th team was not added. The 1984 Tour started with 170 cyclists, divided into 17 teams of 10 cyclists:

Start list

By team

By rider

By nationality

References

1984 Tour de France
1984